Strzemeszna  is a village in the administrative district of Gmina Czerniewice, within Tomaszów Mazowiecki County, Łódź Voivodeship, in central Poland.

The village has an approximate population of 350.

References

Strzemeszna